Jelem

Maubisse (Maubesse, Mau-Bessi, Maobisse, Maubise) is a historic town in the hills 70 km south of Dili, in Ainaro District, East Timor. It is a popular tourist destination and a weekend visiting spot for people from the capital. The suco has 6,229 inhabitants (2015).

Climate
Maubisse has a tropical savanna climate (Köppen Aw), bordering on a subtropical highland climate (Köppen Cwb) due to its high elevation.

References

Further reading

 

Populated places in East Timor
Ainaro Municipality